The Duquesne Coal is a geologic formation in Pennsylvania. It preserves fossils dating back to the Carboniferous period.

See also

 List of fossiliferous stratigraphic units in Pennsylvania
 Paleontology in Pennsylvania

References
 

Carboniferous geology of Pennsylvania